Mimorsidis is a genus of longhorn beetles of the subfamily Lamiinae, containing the following species:

 Mimorsidis andamanicus Breuning, 1953
 Mimorsidis lemoulti Breuning
 Mimorsidis mausoni Breuning, 1947
 Mimorsidis medanus Breuning, 1954
 Mimorsidis sarawakensis Hayashi, 1976
 Mimorsidis scutellatus Gressitt, 1951
 Mimorsidis yayeyamensis Samuelson, 1965

References

Lamiini